Grillenberg may refer to the following villages:

 Grillenberg (Albeck), village in the municipality of Albeck, county of Feldkirchen, Carinthia, Austria
 Grillenberg (Deggendorf), village in the borough of Deggendorf, county of Deggendorf, Bavaria, Germany
 Grillenberg (Hernstein), cadastral municipality of Hernstein, county of Baden, Lower Austria
 Grillenberg (Sangerhausen), village in the borough of Sangerhausen, county of Mansfeld-Südharz, Saxony-Anhalt, Germany
 Grillenberg (Simbach), village in the municipality of Simbach, county of Dingolfing-Landau, Bavaria, Germany
 Grillenberg (Thyrnau), village in the municipality of Thyrnau, county of Passau, Bavaria, Germany